This is a list of airports in the Central African Republic, sorted by location.



Airports 

Airport names shown in bold indicate the airport has scheduled commercial airline service.

See also 
 Central African Republic Air Force
 Transport in the Central African Republic
 List of airports by ICAO code: F#FE – Central African Republic
 Wikipedia: WikiProject Aviation/Airline destination lists: Africa#Central African Republic

References 
 
  - includes IATA codes
 World Aero Data: Central African Republic - ICAO codes
 Great Circle Mapper: Central African Republic - IATA and ICAO codes

Central African Republic
List
Airports
Airports
Central African Republic